Faisal bin Khalid bin Sultan Al Saud ( Fayṣal bin Khalid bin Sulṭan Āl Sa'ūd) (born 10 July 1973) is a member of House of Saud and the governor of the Northern Borders Region from 22 April 2017.

Early life and education
His father Khalid bin Sultan was the former deputy minister of defense and his grandfather was Crown Prince Sultan. His mother, Lulwa, was a daughter of King Fahd who died in April 2022. 

Prince Faisal holds a bachelor's degree in political science from King Saud University. He attended Basic Underwater Demolition/SEAL training (BUD/S) at Naval Amphibious Base Coronado and graduated from BUD/S class 189. He received his master's degree with honors in International Affairs from the University of Massachusetts in Boston, USA.

Career
Prince Faisal was appointed as an advisor to the Crown Prince's Court in 2006. In 2016 King Salman bin Abdulaziz issued an order appointing him as an adviser at the Royal Court. On 22 April 2017, King Salman appointed him as the governor of the Northern Border Region with the rank of minister. He replaced Mishaal bin Abdullah Al Jiluwi in the post.

Personal life
His first wife was Madawi bint Khalid bin Abdullah bin Muhammad Al Saud. In 2013 he married Sarah bint Khalid bin Musa'ed bin Abdul Rahman bin Faisal Al Saud.

References

Faisal
1973 births
Faisal
Faisal
Living people
Faisal